Volga rice (sometimes boruga rice) is a fried rice dish popular in Echizen, Fukui Prefecture, Japan. Sometimes classed as one of the Three Delicacies of Echizen alongside oroshi soba and ekimae chuka soba, it is a variant of omurice made of a base of fried rice which is then topped with an omelet and crumb-covered pork cutlet; the whole is then covered in rich sauce. There is no proven explanation for the name "Volga rice", though there are various theories.

References

Echizen, Fukui
Fried rice
Pork dishes
Egg dishes